Andrew John Barlow (born 24 November 1965) is an English former professional footballer. He played as a left-back in a career spanning fifteen years, and made more than 400 league appearances.

Barlow began his career with his hometown club, Oldham Athletic, and spent ten of his eleven years at Boundary Park playing under manager Joe Royle. At Oldham he played in the 1990 Football League Cup Final.

In 1995, he signed for Sam Allardyce's Blackpool, with whom he spent two years before joining Rochdale. He brought his playing career to a close at Spotland. He scored his only goal for the club, against Brighton in a 1–1 draw, with the last touch of his professional career.

Post-retirement, he became a coach with the PFA, a role he continues to fulfill.

References

External links

1965 births
Footballers from Oldham
Living people
English footballers
Oldham Athletic A.F.C. players
Bradford City A.F.C. players
Blackpool F.C. players
Rochdale A.F.C. players
Premier League players
English Football League players
Ramsbottom United F.C. players
Association football fullbacks